Prof. Jagdish Mukhi (born 1 December 1942) is an Indian politician who served as the Governor of Assam from 2017 till 2023 and the Governor of Nagaland (Additional Charge) from 2021 to 2023.  He is a member of the Bharatiya Janata Party and the Rashtriya Swayamsevak Sangh. Past positions have included Lieutenant Governor of Andaman and Nicobar Islands, Minister of Finance, Planning, Excise and Taxation and Higher Education in the Delhi government.

Early years and family life
Jagdish Mukhi was born on 1 December 1942 in Dajal to a Saraiki Hindu family. At age 4, during the Partition of India, the family moved to Sohna.

Mukhi gained a B.Com. from Raj Rishi College in Alwar, Rajasthan in 1965, followed by a M.Com. from the University of Delhi in 1967. Until entering politics he was a professor at Shaheed Bhagat Singh College, Delhi University. He was awarded a PhD in finance from Kurukshetra University in October 1995.

He married Prem Grover in 1970, who as Prem Mukhi is actively involved in social development works for women empowerment under the banner of Mahila Jagriti Sangh. He is blessed with a son Atul (BE, MBA) and a daughter Latika.

Political career 

Mukhi attended an RSS training camp while at school in Panipat in 1958, became the secretary (Karyawaha) of Alwar District RSS in 1964, and campaigned against the Emergency with the Delhi RSS in 1975.
Having moved to Janakpuri, Delhi in 1973, he became the General Secretary of the Janakpuri branch of the nascent Janata Party in September 1977.

His first election success was in a 1980 by-election for the advisory Delhi Metropolitan Council.

He held the role of Minister of Higher Education, when he launched Guru Gobind Singh Indraprastha University in the record time of 8 months.

He was awarded as best planning minister of the nation by the then Union planning minister Pranab Mukherjee. Two times he was awarded best MLA award in Delhi Vidhan Sabha.
He represented Janak Puri constituency continuously from 1980 and has won seven continuous Vidhan Sabha elections from the same constituency, until losing the 2014 election by 25000 votes to AAP leader Mr. Rajesh Rishi.
He has worked at all levels in the BJP & given the best performance as president, BJP Mandal Janak Puri; General Secretary, BJP West District; President, BJP West District; General Secretary, BJP Delhi; Prabhari, BJP affairs Jammu & Kashmir; Prabhari BJP affairs Haryana.

He became Lieutenant Governor of Andaman and Nicobar Islands in August 2016, then Governor of Assam in September 2017.

References 

|-

|-

External links 
 Prof. Jagdish Mukhi
 Jagdish Mukhi Biography
 Awards
 Affidavit's Links

1942 births
Living people
Bharatiya Janata Party politicians from Delhi
Members of the Delhi Legislative Assembly
State cabinet ministers of Delhi
People from Dera Ghazi Khan District
Academic staff of Delhi University
University of Rajasthan alumni
Delhi University alumni
Leaders of the Opposition in the Delhi Legislative Assembly
Delhi MLAs 2013–2015
Delhi MLAs 2008–2013
People from South Delhi district
Lieutenant governors of the Andaman and Nicobar Islands